The events of the equestrian at the 2004 Summer Olympics featured three equestrian disciplines: dressage, eventing and jumping. All three disciplines are further divided into individual and team contests for a total of six events.

The Markopoulo Olympic Equestrian Centre, on the outskirts of Markopoulo in the Attica region of Greece, hosted the dressage and jumping events while the eventing took place in the nearby Eventing Park.

Medal table

Medalists

Schedule
Equestrian events took place over 14 days, from 14 August to 27 August.  Eventing was held on the first five days, while the other two disciplines overlapped for most of the rest of the schedule.

 14 August
 Eventing - first horse inspection
 15 August
 Eventing - dressage
 16 August
 Eventing - dressage
 17 August
 Eventing - cross country
 18 August
 Eventing - second horse inspection
 Eventing - first round of jumping (used for team jumping portion and individual qualification)
 Eventing - individual jumping final
 19 August
 Dressage - horse inspection
 Jumping - training
 20 August
 Dressage - grand prix
 Jumping - first horse inspection
 21 August
 Dressage - grand prix
 22 August
 Jumping - first qualifier
 23 August
 Dressage - grand prix special
 24 August
 Jumping - second qualifier (first team round)
 Jumping - third qualifier (second team round)
 Jumping - team jump-off
 25 August
 Dressage - grand prix freestyle
 26 August
 Jumping - second horse inspection
 27 August
 Jumping - final round A
 Jumping - final round B
 Jumping - jump-off

Officials
Appointment of officials was as follows:

Dressage
  Mariëtte Withages (Ground Jury President)
  Vincenzo Truppa (Ground Jury Member)
  Francis Verbeek-van Rooy (Ground Jury Member)
  Wojktek Markowski (Ground Jury Member)
  Dieter Schüle (Ground Jury Member)
  Beatrice Bürchler-Keller (Ground Jury Member)
  Stephen Clarke (Ground Jury Member)

Jumping
  Sven Holmberg (Ground Jury President)
  José Alvarez de Bohorques (Ground Jury Member)
  Francois Ferland (Ground Jury Member)
  Leonidas Georgopoulos (Ground Jury Member)
  Leopoldo Palacios (Technical Delegate)

Eventing
  Christoph Hess (Ground Jury President)
  Angela Tucker (Ground Jury Member)
  Cara Whitham (Ground Jury Member)
  Albino Garbari (Course Designer)
  Michael Etherington-Smith (Technical Delegate)

References

External links
Official result book – Equestrian

 
2004
2004 Summer Olympics events